Plowed may refer to:

 Plowed (EP), a 1992 EP by Cows
 "Plowed" (song), a 1994 song by Sponge